Karl Spangenberg was an American engineer, social scientist, academic, futurist, writer, and visionary.

Affiliations 
Spangenberg was a member of the American Physical Society and became an IRE (now IEEE) Associate in 1934, Senior Member in 1945, and Fellow in 1949.

Publications 
Spangenberg authored "Vacuum Tubes" (1948) and "Fundamentals of Electron Devices" and edited "Electromagnetics in Space: Antenna Considerations as Related to Space Communications" (1965).

Education 
He received the B.S. and the M.S. degree in electrical engineering from Case Institute of Technology, in 1932 and 1933, respectively, and the Ph.D. degree from Ohio State University, Columbus, in 1937.

His PhD adviser was William Littell Everitt, a founding member of the National Academy of Engineering.

Career 
Spangenberg spent decades teaching in the Electrical Engineering Department of Stanford University in California.

He was an adviser of numerous outstanding scientists in Stanford University including Willis Harman, Robert Helliwell, and Chih-Tang Sah.

In the European Theater during World War II he was Head of the Electronics Division of the Office of Naval Research, 1948 to 1948.

Head of the Electronic Engineering Department of the Instituto Technologica de Aeronautica in the state of Sao Paulo, Brazil, 1952 to 1954.

By the early 1960s, Spangenberg was a consultant on engineering management and education to various companies, mostly in the San Francisco Bay area.

Honors 
Spangenberg Theater in Palo Alto was named in his honor.

References 

American engineers